15th Joseph Plateau Awards
2000

Best Film: 
 Rosetta 
The 14th Joseph Plateau Awards honoured the best Belgian filmmaking of 1999 and 2000.

Winners

Best Belgian Actor
 Josse De Pauw - Everybody's Famous! (Iedereen beroemd!)
Peter Van den Begin - Film 1
Olivier Gourmet - The Journey to Paris (Le voyage à Paris) and Rosetta

Best Belgian Actress
 Émilie Dequenne - Rosetta
Antje De Boeck - A Dog of Flanders
Eva Van Der Gucht - Everybody's Famous! (Iedereen beroemd!)

Best Belgian Director
 Jean-Pierre and Luc Dardenne - Rosetta
Dominique Deruddere - Everybody's Famous! (Iedereen beroemd!)
Frédéric Fonteyne - A Pornographic Affair (Une liaison pornographique)

Best Belgian Film
 Rosetta
Everybody's Famous! (Iedereen beroemd!)
A Pornographic Affair (Une liaison pornographique)

Best Belgian Screenplay

Box Office Award
 Rosetta

Joseph Plateau Music Award
 Wim Mertens - Molokai: The Story of Father Damien

Joseph Plateau Award of Honour
 Hans Zimmer

Joseph Plateau Life Achievement Award
 Morgan Freeman

2000 film awards